This is the list of international prime ministerial trips made by David Cameron, who served as the 53rd Prime Minister of the United Kingdom from 11 May 2010 to 13 July 2016. David Cameron made 148 trips to 62 countries (in addition to visiting the Occupied Palestinian Territories) during his premiership.

The number of visits per country:
 One visit to Algeria, Austria, Brazil, Bulgaria, Denmark, Egypt, Finland, Grenada, Hungary, Iceland, Ireland, Israel, Jamaica, Kazakhstan, Kuwait, Lebanon, Liberia, Lithuania, Luxembourg, Mexico, Myanmar, Nigeria, Norway, Oman, Qatar, Romania, Slovakia, Slovenia, South Korea, Sri Lanka and Vietnam.
 Two visits to Australia, Canada, China, Indonesia, Japan, Jordan, Latvia, Libya, Malaysia, Malta, Pakistan, Portugal, Singapore, South Africa, Spain and Sweden.
 Three visits to the Czech Republic, India, the Netherlands, Russia, Saudi Arabia, Turkey and the United Arab Emirates.
 Five visits to Italy and Poland.
 Six visits to Switzerland.
 Nine visits to Afghanistan.
 Ten visits to the United States.
 Twelve visits to Germany.
 Eighteen visits to France.
 Fifty visits to Belgium.

2010

2011

2012

2013

2014

2015

2016

Multilateral meetings 
David Cameron participated in the following summits during his premiership:

See also 
 Foreign relations of the United Kingdom
 List of international prime ministerial trips made by Theresa May
 List of international prime ministerial trips made by Boris Johnson
 List of international prime ministerial trips made by Rishi Sunak

References 
David Cameron
2010s in international relations
State visits by British leaders
Foreign relations of the United Kingdom
Cameron
Cameron
British prime ministerial visits
21st century in international relations